The Bobaia oil field is an oil field located in Aninoasa, Gorj County. It was discovered in 1984 and developed by Petrom. It began production in 1985 and produces oil.

References

Oil fields in Romania